"Afrika Shox" is a song by the English electronic group Leftfield, released as the first single from their album Rhythm and Stealth in 1999, and features the vocal talent of American musician Afrika Bambaataa. It was released on CD and 12" on 6 September 1999 on the Hard Hands record label, published by Chrysalis Music. The song was their highest-charting single, reaching #7 in the UK Singles Chart. The song was later used in the 2001 film Vanilla Sky and was included in the film's soundtrack album.

Music video
The music video was directed by Chris Cunningham and was one of the first videos to be put into DVD quality featured in the demo disc featured in issue 50 of The Official UK PlayStation Magazine.

Track listing

12"
 "Afrika Shox" (VW Remix) – 6:19
 "Phat Planet" – 5:24
 "Afrika Shox" (Jedis Elastic Bass Remix) – 6:12

CD 1
 "Afrika Shox" (Radio Edit) – 3:43
 "Phat Planet" – 5:24
 "Afrika Shox" (Jedis Elastic Bass Mix) – 6:12

CD 2
 "Afrika Shox" (VW Remix) – 6:19
 "Phat Planet" (Dave Clarke Remix) – 5:52
 "Afrika Shox" (Video)

Personnel
Initial copies of the 12" release had a sticker incorrectly stating the version of "Phat Planet" was the Dave Clarke mix (which is available on Stealth Remixes)

Charts

References

External links
"Afrika Shox" music video on YouTube
Article and screencaps

Leftfield songs
1999 songs
1999 singles
Music videos directed by Chris Cunningham
Breakbeat songs